Nephrurus eromanga is a species of gecko. Like all species of Nephrurus it is endemic to Australia.

References

Geckos of Australia
Nephrurus
Reptiles described in 2022